The Gage Park Bungalow Historic District is a residential historic district in the Gage Park neighborhood of Chicago, Illinois. The district includes 465 Chicago bungalows and eighteen other residential buildings. The bungalows were built between 1919 and 1931, a time in which single-family homeownership became broadly accessible in Chicago; as bungalows could be mass-built affordably, they appealed to these new homeowners. Gage Park, an underbuilt neighborhood in southwest Chicago, was one of the many outlying areas of the city in which large numbers of new bungalows were built in the early twentieth century. While the bungalows have a consistent shape and are set back evenly from the street, giving the district a uniform appearance, variations in color, brick patterns, and roof forms differentiate the individual houses.

The district was added to the National Register of Historic Places on March 13, 2020.

References

National Register of Historic Places in Chicago
Historic districts in Chicago
Bungalow architecture in Illinois